Edge Wireless LLC was a mobile phone provider founded in 1999 by Wayne Perry, Cal Cannon and Donnie Castleman, serving southern Oregon, northern California, southeastern Idaho and Jackson, Wyoming.

Edge Wireless's network, currently owned by AT&T, is a 1900 MHz (PCS) GSM network. The company partnered with AT&T Mobility so users of either service could roam onto the other's network.

The acquisition by AT&T was completed in April 2008.

See also
 List of companies based in Oregon

References

External links
District Court opinion on case versus U.S. Cellular

Defunct mobile phone companies of the United States
Companies based in Bend, Oregon
Retail companies established in 1999
Telecommunications companies established in 1999
Retail companies disestablished in 2008
Defunct companies based in Oregon
1999 establishments in Oregon
2008 disestablishments in Oregon